Ussery is a surname. Notable people with the surname include:

 Bobby Ussery (born 1935), American thoroughbred jockey
 Terdema Ussery (born 1958), American basketball executive
 Wilfred Ussery (born 1928), American civic leader
 Jeff Ussery (born 1979), Corporate Executive, Mayor of Republic, MO

See also
 Asteroid 17831 Ussery